Gorgopis annulosa is a moth of the family Hepialidae. It is known from South Africa.

References

Moths described in 1930
Hepialidae